= Naiwala =

- Location within Pakistan
- Coordinates: 30.59°N 70.53°E
- Country: Pakistan
- Province: Punjab
- Elevation: 136 m (446 ft)
- Time zone: UTC+5 (PST)

Naiwala نائی والا is a village in the Punjab of Pakistan. It is located at 30°59'40N 70°53'0E with an altitude of 136 metres (449 feet).
